Gregory Kirk Ridgeway (born 1973) is professor of criminology and statistics at the University of Pennsylvania, where he is also chair of the Department of Criminology.

Education
Ridgeway received his B.S. from California Polytechnic State University in 1995 and his M.S. and Ph.D. from the University of Washington in 1997 and 1999, respectively. All three of his degrees are in statistics. His Ph.D. thesis was entitled "Generalization of boosting algorithms and applications of Bayesian inference for massive datasets".

Career
Early in his career, Ridgeway worked at the RAND Corporation, where he served as the director of the Safety and Justice Program from 2009 to 2012, and of the Center for Quality Policing from 2008 to 2012. He later served as the acting director of the National Institute of Justice for 19 months before joining the University of Pennsylvania in August 2014. In January 2021, he was named the co-editor-in-chief of the Journal of Quantitative Criminology.

Research
Ridgeway's research focuses on using statistical techniques to examine aspects of the United States' criminal justice system. These aspects include, but are not limited to, stop-and-frisk in New York City, which, in a 2007 study, he found was racially biased, with blacks and Hispanics being more likely to be frisked, searched, or arrested once stopped (though they were no more likely to be stopped than whites).

Honors and awards
Ridgeway is a fellow of the American Statistical Association.

References

External links
Faculty page

Living people
American criminologists
1973 births
University of Pennsylvania faculty
American statisticians
Fellows of the American Statistical Association
California Polytechnic State University alumni
University of Washington alumni
RAND Corporation people